The canton of Maurepas is an administrative division of the Yvelines department, northern France. Its borders were modified at the French canton reorganisation which came into effect in March 2015. Its seat is in Maurepas.

It consists of the following communes:
 
Châteaufort
Chevreuse
Choisel
Coignières
Dampierre-en-Yvelines
Lévis-Saint-Nom
Magny-les-Hameaux
Maurepas
Le Mesnil-Saint-Denis
Milon-la-Chapelle
Saint-Forget
Saint-Lambert
Saint-Rémy-lès-Chevreuse
Senlisse
Toussus-le-Noble
Voisins-le-Bretonneux

References

Cantons of Yvelines